Werni is an ethnic group in the Nuba Hills in South Kurdufan in Sudan. They speak Warnang, a Niger–Congo language. The population of this group likely is at several thousand.

References

Ethnic groups in Sudan